This is the list of the main career statistics of professional Russian tennis player Veronika Kudermetova. She left her mark in both singles and doubles events, her achievements happened on many levels. On the WTA rankings, she get to her both career-highs in 2022; in singles, to the place of No. 9 while in doubles, she became world No. 2. She has won one singles title and six doubles titles on the WTA Tour. In addition, she has won five WTA Challenger titles (one in singles and four in doubles), as well as 20 ITF Circuit titles (4 in singles and 16 in doubles). She is also active in playing in international tournaments for Russia, winning one Billie Jean King Cup title and reaching fourth place at the Summer Olympics in doubles event alongside Elena Vesnina.

At the WTA Tour-level tournaments, she first get most recognized when she won title at the 2019 Wuhan Open in doubles event, alongside Duan Yingying. The following year, she reached her first Grand Slam semifinal in doubles event. Her improvements at the Grand Slam tournaments continued, reaching first final at the 2021 Wimbledon Championships alongside Vesnina. At the 2022 French Open, she advanced to her first quarterfinal in singles at a major. Season of 2021 was remarkable when she on her Summer Olympics debut reached semifinals in doubles. In November 2021, she won her first Billie Jean King Cup title after ensuring three wins in doubles for the Russian team during the Finals stage.

Performance timelines

Only main-draw results in WTA Tour, Grand Slam tournaments, Fed Cup/Billie Jean King Cup and Olympic Games are included in win–loss records.

Singles
Current after the 2023 Dubai Open.

Doubles
Current after the 2023 Dubai Tennis Championships.

Significant finals

Grand Slam tournament finals

Doubles: 1 (runner-up)

WTA Championships finals

Doubles: 1 (title)

Olympic finals

Doubles: 1 (4th place)

WTA 1000 finals

Doubles: 6 (3 titles, 3 runner-ups)

WTA career finals

Singles: 5 (1 title, 4 runner-ups)

Doubles: 13 (6 titles, 7 runner-ups)

WTA 125 tournament finals

Singles: 1 (1 title)

Doubles: 4 (4 titles)

ITF Circuit finals
Kudermdetova debuted at the ITF Women's Circuit in 2011 at the $50k event in Kazan, Russia in doubles. In singles, she has been in eight finals and won four of them, while in doubles, she has been in 27 finals and won 16 of them. Her biggest titles on the ITF Circuit were three $100k doubles tournaments, the Open de Marseille, the President's Cup and the Neva Cup, all in 2017.

Singles: 8 (4 titles, 4 runner–ups)

Doubles: 27 (16 titles, 11 runner–ups)

Fed Cup/Billie Jean King Cup participation

Singles (0–3)

Doubles (3–1)

WTA Tour career earnings
Current after the 2023 Abu Dhabi Open.
{|cellpadding=3 cellspacing=0 border=1 style=border:#aaa;solid:1px;border-collapse:collapse;text-align:center;
|-style=background:#eee;font-weight:bold
|width="90"|Year
|width="100"|Grand Slam <br/ >titles|width="100"|WTA <br/ >titles
|width="100"|Total <br/ >titles
|width="120"|Earnings ($)
|width="100"|Money list rank
|-
|2014
|0
|0
|0
| align="right" |16,786
|352
|-
|2015
|0
|0
|0
| align="right" |10,751
|489
|-
|2016
|0
|0
|0
| align="right" |33,114
|301
|-
|2017
|0
|0
|0
| align="right" |91,304
|209
|-
|2018
|0
|0
|0
| align="right" |167,256
|174
|-
|2019
|0
|1
|1
| align="right" |843,932
|46
|-
|2020
|0
|0
|0
| align="right" |481,231
|44
|-
|2021
|0
|2
|2
| align="right" |1,170,869
|26
|-
|2022
|0
|3
|3
| align="right" |2,070,680
|13
|-
|2023
|0
|0
|0
| align="right" |188,610
|35
|- style="font-weight:bold"
|Career
|0
|6
|6
| align="right" |5,106,696
|132
|}

Career Grand Slam statistics
The tournaments won by Kudermetova are in boldface, and advanced into finals by Kudermetova are in italics.

Seedings
Singles

Doubles

Best Grand Slam results details
Grand Slam winners are in boldface', and runner–ups are in italics''.

Singles

Record against other players

Record against top 10 players

 She has a  record against players who were, at the time the match was played, ranked in the top 10.

Double bagel matches

Win without dropping a single game

Awards
 The Russian Cup in the nominations:
 Team of the Year – Girls Under-14: 2011;
 Team of the Year – Girls Under-16: 2013;
 Olympians-2020;
 Team of the Year: 2021.

Notes

References

Kudermetova, Veronika